"Candidatus Brocadia" is a candidatus genus of bacteria. Many of the species in this genus are capable of anammox.

Phylogeny 
Phylogeny based on GTDB 07-RS207 by Genome Taxonomy Database

References

Planctomycetota
Candidatus taxa